Andrej Šupka (born 22 January 1977) is a Slovak footballer. He competed in the men's tournament at the 2000 Summer Olympics.

References

External links
 

1977 births
Living people
Slovak footballers
Olympic footballers of Slovakia
Footballers at the 2000 Summer Olympics
Sportspeople from Trenčín
Association football defenders
FK Dubnica players